Francesca Carbone (born 17 July 1968 in Genoa) is an Italian former sprinter (400 m).

Biography
In her career she won 4 times in the national championships. She has 35 caps in national team from 1989 to 2001.

National records
 4x400 metres relay: 3'26"69 ( Paris, 20 June 1999) - with Virna De Angeli, Patrizia Spuri, Danielle Perpoli
 4x400 metres relay indoor: 3'35"01 ( Ghent, 27 February 2000) - with Virna De Angeli, Patrizia Spuri, Carla Barbarino

Achievements

National titles
1 win on 400 metres at the Italian Athletics Championships (1993)
3 wins on 400 metres at the Italian Athletics Indoor Championships (1993, 1995, 2000)

References

External links
 

1968 births
Italian female sprinters
Living people
Sportspeople from Genoa
Athletes (track and field) at the 2000 Summer Olympics
Olympic athletes of Italy
Mediterranean Games gold medalists for Italy
Mediterranean Games silver medalists for Italy
Mediterranean Games bronze medalists for Italy
Athletes (track and field) at the 1993 Mediterranean Games
Athletes (track and field) at the 1997 Mediterranean Games
Athletes (track and field) at the 2001 Mediterranean Games
World Athletics Championships athletes for Italy
Mediterranean Games medalists in athletics
Olympic female sprinters
20th-century Italian women
21st-century Italian women